Leptogaster guttiventris  is a Palearctic species of robber fly in the family Asilidae.

References

External links
Geller Grim Robberflies of Germany
Images representing Leptogaster guttiventris

Brachyceran flies of Europe
Asilidae
Insects described in 1842